State Road 46 (SR 46) is an east–west route in central Florida, running from U.S. Route 441 (US 441) in Mount Dora to US 1 in Mims. Along the way, it crosses the Wekiva River and, further east, the St. Johns River near the Econlockhatchee River.

County Road 46 continues west from the western terminus to County Road Old 441 in Mount Dora.

Route description

State Road 46 begins as Sanford Road at an at-grade intersection with US 441, where it changes from a County Road to a State Road. Here, there are direct ramp movements connecting southbound US 441 with eastbound State Route 46 and westbound State Road 46 to northbound US 441. After the intersection with Round Lake Road, SR 46 turns northeast and runs parallel to an abandoned railroad line, which it then curves away from, but then encounters at a former grade crossing in Sorrento just west of the intersection with County Road 437, which shares a brief concurrency with SR 46 for several blocks. East of Sorrento, the road becomes Sorrento Avenue, a name it maintains as it passes by County Road 435 in Mount Plymouth, and then Seminole State Forest. Before entering the forest however, SR 46 passes by Mount Plymouth Lake to the south, intersecting County Road 46A at an at-grade intersection and the current northern terminus of State Route 429 at a modified diamond interchange, merging onto the latter's future alignment. Here, State Road 46 also encounters the same right-of-way for the abandoned railroad to the north, which runs parallel to the road as even after it leaves the forest on a bridge over the Wekiva River at the Lake-Seminole County line becoming North Henderson Lane, and running along the south end of Lower Wekiva River Preserve State Park. After the intersections with Orange Avenue and Wayside Drive, SR 46 becomes a four lane divided highway before reaching the interchange with Interstate 4, and later joins a concurrency with U.S. Route 17/92, the latter of these routes is in a wrong-way concurrency. Along this segment, US 17/92/SR 46 passes by the Sanford SunRail station before it climbs a bridge over the CSX Sanford Subdivision then intersects Persimmon Avenue, a road leading to the Sanford Auto Train Station, and former passenger station. Eventually the triple-concurrency enters the City of Sanford where it is renamed West First Street. Closer to downtown Sanford the divider ends west of Avocado Avenue, but begins again before it turns south onto South French Avenue. During this triple-concurrency, US 17-92-SR 46 intersects a pair of railroad crossings at a junction of two freight lines, and then another one at the intersection of West 13th Street, also the western terminus of County Road 415. SR 46 then branches off to the east again at H.E. Thomas Jr. Parkway (County Road 46A) and 25th Street. SR 46 runs along the northern border of the Orlando Sanford International Airport, then after the southern terminus of State Road 415, uses a bridge over Lake Jesup at the St. Johns River then become Geneva Avenue as it heads southeast. East of Geneva, the road crosses the St. Johns River itself using the Mims Bridge south of Lake Harney, and entering Volusia County. The journey through Volusia is short-lived though, because the road quickly enters Brevard County and turns straight east at Southmere, where it becomes Carpenter Road. SR 46 finally enters Mims in the vicinity of Interstate 95 at Exit 223, and then ends at US 1.

History 
The intersection at the western terminus of State Route 46 and US 441 was previously a diamond interchange, but was downgraded as part of the Wekiva Parkway project.

County Road 46A previously cut through a portion of the Seminole State Forest and met State Road 46 further east, but was realigned to meet State Road 46 west of it to reduce its impact.

Between State Road 429 and the Lake-Seminole County Line, State Road 46 was realigned to follow the future alignment of State Road 429, resulting in a few segments of highway being bypassed and orphaned.

Future
SR 46 will be truncated at its interchanges with SR 453 and SR 429 when the Wekiva Parkway project is completed in 2022, resulting in two discontinuous segments.

Major intersections

Related routes

County Road 46

County Road 46 is a county extension of State Road 46 in Mount Dora in Lake County in Florida. It runs along East First Avenue from CR Old 441 in the west to a diamond interchange with U.S. Route 441 and SR 46 in the east. West of Old CR 441, East First Avenue is a city street in Mount Dora.

County Road 46A (Lake County)

County Road 46A is a county suffixed route of SR 46 along the southwest side of Seminole State Forest in Lake County. It runs along East First Avenue from State Road 44 east of Mount Dora and Eustis to the west to SR 46 to the east.

County Road 46A (Seminole County)

County Road 46A is another county suffixed route of SR 46 in Seminole County. It is signed along H.E. Thomas Jr. Parkway (former 25th Street) from CR 431 east to US 17/92 / SR 46 in Sanford.

References

Florida State Road Atlas (American Map Corporation; 2003)

External links

Florida Route Log (SR 46)
Florida State Road 46(SouthEastRoads.com)

046
Econlockhatchee River
046
046
046
046
046